Pisulinella is an extinct genus of submarine cave snails, marine gastropod mollusks in the family Neritiliidae.

Species
Species within the genus Pisulinella include:
 † Pisulinella aucoini Lozouet, 2004 
 † Pisulinella miocenica Kano & Kase, 2000 
 † Pisulinella pacifica Kano & Kase, 2000

References

 Lozouet, P., 2004. The European Tertiary Neritiliidae (Mollusca, Gastropoda, Neritopsina): indicators of tropical submarine cave environments and freshwater faunas. Zoological Journal of the Linnean Society 140: 447-467 With 9 figures

External links
 

Neritiliidae